Sędki  is a village in the administrative district of Gmina Ełk, within Ełk County, Warmian-Masurian Voivodeship, in northern Poland.

Notable residents
 Horst Großmann (1891–1972), general

References

Villages in Ełk County